Ignasin  is a village in the administrative district of Gmina Fajsławice, within Krasnystaw County, Lublin Voivodeship, in eastern Poland.

The village has an approximate population of 300.

References

Ignasin